Rebecca Jean Moellman-Landa (born 1955) is an American speech-language pathologist specializing in neuropsychology and autism research. She is the founder and director of the center for autism and related disorders at the Kennedy Krieger Institute. Landa is a professor of psychiatry and behavioral sciences at the Johns Hopkins School of Medicine.

Life 
Landa was born in 1955. She earned a B.S. from Towson University in 1977. Landa completed a M.S. at the Pennsylvania State University in 1978. She earned a Ph.D. from the University of Washington in 1985. Her dissertation was titled, Effectiveness of language elicitation tasks with two-year-olds. Landa conducted postdoctoral research in psychiatric genetics at the Johns Hopkins University.

Landa is the founder, vice president, and director of the Center for Autism and Related Disorders at the Kennedy Krieger Institute. She is a professor of psychiatry and behavioral sciences at the Johns Hopkins School of Medicine. She investigates neuropsychological, learning, and communication processes in people with autism across their lifespan.

References 

Living people
1955 births
Place of birth missing (living people)
Towson University alumni
Pennsylvania State University alumni
University of Washington alumni
Johns Hopkins School of Medicine faculty
Speech and language pathologists
American pathologists
Women pathologists
21st-century American women scientists
American medical researchers
Women medical researchers
Autism researchers